Brookville Lake Dam (National ID # IN03017) is a dam in Brookville Township, Franklin County, Indiana, just north of Brookville, in the southeastern part of the state.

The earthen dam was constructed in 1974 by the United States Army Corps of Engineers with a height of 181 feet and 2800 feet long at its crest.  It impounds the East Fork of the Whitewater River for flood control and storm water management.  The dam is owned and operated by the Louisville District, Great Lakes and Ohio River Division of the Corps of Engineers.

The riverine reservoir it creates, Brookville Lake, has a normal water surface of 8.2 square miles, a maximum capacity of 359,600 acre-feet, and normal storage of 184,900 acre-feet.  Recreation includes boating, hiking, hunting, and fishing (for bluegill, largemouth bass, smallmouth bass, striped bass, catfish, walleye, crappie, muskellunge, trout, and white bass).  Adjacent facilities include the Mounds State Recreation Area and the Whitewater Memorial State Park.

References 

Dams in Indiana
Reservoirs in Indiana
United States Army Corps of Engineers dams
Dams completed in 1974
Buildings and structures in Franklin County, Indiana
Earth-filled dams
Bodies of water of Franklin County, Indiana